Agulu is a large town in Anambra State, Nigeria. It is located in  Anaocha Local Government Area. Agulu is under the Anambra Central Senatorial District. It is home to the Agulu Lake. Agulu community has prominent men and women in politics, industries, academia and the government. The community also has produced a Governor in Anambra State in the person of Mr Peter Obi. Agulu is also known for the Agulu-Nanka erosion sites. Agulu comprises twenty villages. These are: Nwanchi, Nneohia, Okpu, Ama-Ezike, Odidama, Amorji, Isiamaigbo, Ukunu, Uhueme, Obeagu, Obe, Nkitaku, Okpu-Ifite, Umubialla, Amatutu, Umuowelle, Umunnowu, Ifiteani, Umuifite, and Nneogidi.

Notable people 

Notable people from Agulu include:
 Peter Obi, former Governor of Anambra State 
 Joy Emodi, former Senator 
 Dora Akunyili, the past NAFDAC Chairman 

The South-East Region Office of the National Agency for Food, Drug Administration and Control (NAFDAC).

Climate
Agulu's wet season is warm, oppressive, and overcast while the dry season is hot, muggy, and partly cloudy. For a period of years, the temperature normally changes from 65 °F to 87 °F.

References

Populated places in Anambra State